So Is Death & Love is an EP by the alternative-rock band This World Fair.  It was released in 2005.  Music critics and journalists considered that the record was ready for airplay on mainstream and college radio.  The first two tracks from the EP, "Amy" and "Drama", were rerecorded for the band's self-titled full-length album, This World Fair. Lyrics of the fifth track of the EP, titled "Silicone", were written in to a newer song by the band called "This Morning".

Track listing
 "Amy" - 3:08
 "Drama" - 3:12
 "Chance" - 3:40
 "Waiting For You" - 3:29
 "Silicone" - 4:04

References

This World Fair albums
2005 EPs